Duport is a French surname. Notable people with the surname include:

James Duport (1606–1679), English classical scholar
Jean-Pierre Duport (1741–1818), cellist
Jean-Louis Duport (1749–1819), cellist, brother of Jean-Pierre
Adrien Duport (1759–1798), French politician
Louis Duport (1781/83–1853), French ballet dancer

French-language surnames